The 2012 Australian Football League finals series determined the winner of the 2012 AFL season. The series was scheduled to occur over four weekends in September 2012, culminating with the 116th AFL/VFL Grand Final at the Melbourne Cricket Ground on 29 September 2012.

The finals system 

The system is a final eight system. This system is currently used by the National Rugby League, and is different from the McIntyre final eight system, which was previously used by both the AFL and the NRL.

The top four teams in the eight receive what is popularly known as the "double chance" when they play in week-one qualifying finals. This means that even if a top-four team loses in the first week, it still remains in the finals, playing a semi-final the next week against the winner of an elimination final. The bottom four of the eight play knock-out games, in that only the winners survive and move on to the next week. Home-state advantage goes to the team with the higher seed in the first two weeks, to the qualifying final winners in the third week. Games in Victoria are played at the MCG, regardless of the team's usual home ground, if a crowd larger than the seating capacity of Etihad Stadium (53,359) is expected.

In the second week, the winners of the qualifying finals receive a bye to the third week. The losers of the qualifying final plays the elimination finals winners in a semi-final. In the third week, the winners of the semi-finals from week two play the winners of the qualifying finals in the first week. The winners of those matches move on to the Grand Final at the MCG in Melbourne.

Qualification

Summary of results

Week one (qualifying & elimination finals)

First qualifying final (Hawthorn vs. Collingwood)

Second qualifying final (Adelaide vs. Sydney)

Second elimination final (Geelong vs. Fremantle)

First elimination final (West Coast vs. North Melbourne)

Week two (semi-finals)

First semi-final (Collingwood vs. West Coast)

Second semi-final (Adelaide vs. Fremantle)

Week three (preliminary finals)

Second preliminary final (Sydney vs. Collingwood)

First preliminary final (Hawthorn vs. Adelaide)

Week four (Grand Final)

Scheduling Issues
There was a number of scheduling issues during the 2012 AFL finals series:
In Week 1, West Coast was forced to play on either the Friday night or Sunday due to Patersons Stadium being unavailable on the Saturday due to a rugby union international between the Wallabies and the Springboks.
The AFL dismissed suggestions that ticket prices were to blame, but said the unusual starting time and possibly the pessimistic expectations of local supporters following their defeat to Sydney the previous week may have led to the poor turnout.
In week 3, a potential fixturing clash between the AFL and NRL at ANZ Stadium in Sydney led to the AFL scheduling the second preliminary on the Friday night. The SCG would usually be used for finals in the event of a fixture clash at ANZ Stadium, but it was unavailable due to a redevelopment. Normally, it is AFL policy to schedule the highest ranked qualifying winner on the Friday night to give that team the longest time to prepare for the grand final the following week.
There was a disagreement about starting time of the first preliminary final.  pushed for a day game to minimise the time difference between its game and the second preliminary final the night before; the AFL and broadcasters preferred a night time-slot to maximise television audiences. The AFL ultimately scheduled a twilight 5:15 pm AEST game as a compromise between the two drivers.

Notes and references

External links 
 AFL official website
 RealFooty by The Age (Melbourne) Online 
 SportsAustralia (news and views)

Finals Series, 2012